Mansion on the Hill may refer to:

 "A Mansion on the Hill", a Fred Rose/Hank Williams song, recorded by Williams in 1948
 "Mansion on the Hill", a Bruce Springsteen song on the album Nebraska
 "Mansion on the Hill", a Neil Young song on the album Ragged Glory
 "Mansion on the Hill", an Alabama 3 song on the album Power in the Blood